Bruce Lemmerman (born October 4, 1945 in Los Angeles, California) is a former professional American football player.

Football career
After a star career at San Fernando Valley State College, where he led the Matadors to their first winning season and the Junior Rose Bowl in 1967, Lemmerman became a backup quarterback for the Atlanta Falcons in 1968 and 1969. He later played ten years in the Canadian Football League for the  Edmonton Eskimos. After his retirement from a playing career in football, Lemmerman became an assistant coach for the Eskimos, the Los Angeles Express of the United States Football League and the NFL's Houston Oilers. Later he was hired as director of operations for Edmonton, and then worked for many years as a scout for the Atlanta Falcons and the New Orleans Saints.

Legacy
Lemmerman is the only CSUN quarterback to play in the NFL, and was inducted into the Matadors Hall of Fame in 1981. He holds multiple records at CSUN that were never surpassed, including single game records for most touchdown passes, most touchdowns through rushing, most points scored, and longest punt. He also holds the CSUN season record for most touchdown passes.

References

1945 births
Living people
American football quarterbacks
Atlanta Falcons players
Cal State Northridge Matadors football players
Edmonton Elks coaches
Edmonton Elks players
Hamilton Tiger-Cats players
Players of American football from Los Angeles
Canadian football quarterbacks
Players of Canadian football from Los Angeles
Sports coaches from Los Angeles